The Huasong 7 is a large MPV produced by Brilliance Auto under the sub-brand Huasong with a 2+2+3 7-seat configuration.

Overview
The Huasong 7 is Huasong's first product, and Huasong vehicles will all be based on existing minivan platforms from Jinbei, which is another sub-brand of Brilliance Automotive. The Huasong 7 debuted on the 2014 Guangzhou Auto Show and was launched on the China car market before the end of 2014.

A facelift version of the Huasong 7 MPV was introduced in 2018 featuring a restyled front bumper integrating a dark mask in the front DRG.

Gallery

See also
Jinbei (marque)

References

External links

official site

Minivans
Full-size vehicles
Cars introduced in 2014
Front-wheel-drive vehicles
2010s cars
Cars of China